José Pedro Sousa Lopes (born 19 September 1988) is a Portuguese football player.

Club career
He made his professional debut in the Segunda Liga for UD Oliveirense on 22 January 2012 in a game against Freamunde.

References

1988 births
Living people
People from Oliveira de Azeméis
Portuguese footballers
U.D. Oliveirense players
C.D. Estarreja players
Liga Portugal 2 players
Association football midfielders
Sportspeople from Aveiro District